Roman glass objects have been recovered across the Roman Empire in domestic, industrial and funerary contexts. Glass was used primarily for the production of vessels, although mosaic tiles and window glass were also produced. Roman glass production developed from Hellenistic technical traditions, initially concentrating on the production of intensely coloured cast glass vessels. However, during the 1st century AD the industry underwent rapid technical growth that saw the introduction of glass blowing and the dominance of colourless or 'aqua' glasses. Production of raw glass was undertaken in geographically separate locations to the working of glass into finished vessels, and by the end of the 1st century AD large scale manufacturing resulted in the establishment of glass as a commonly available material in the Roman world, and one which also had technically very difficult specialized types of luxury glass, which must have been very expensive.

Growth of the Roman glass industry

Despite the growth of glass working in the Hellenistic World and the growing place of glass in material culture, at the beginning of the 1st century AD there was still no Latin word for it in the Roman world. However, glass was being produced in Roman contexts using primarily Hellenistic techniques and styles (see glass, history) by the late Republican period. The majority of manufacturing techniques were time-consuming, and the initial product was a thick-walled vessel which required considerable finishing. This, combined with the cost of importing natron for the production of raw glass, contributed to the limited use of glass and its position as an expensive and high-status material.

The glass industry was therefore a relatively minor craft during the Republican period; although, during the early decades of the 1st century AD the quantity and diversity of glass vessels available increased dramatically. This was a direct result of the massive growth of the Roman influence at the end of the Republican period, the Pax Romana that followed the decades of civil war, and the stabilisation of the state that occurred under Augustus' rule. Still, Roman glasswares were already making their way from Western Asia (i.e. the Parthian Empire) to the Kushan Empire in Afghanistan and India and as far as the Han Empire of China. The first Roman glass found in China came from an early 1st-century BC tomb at Guangzhou, ostensibly via the South China Sea.

In addition to this a major new technique in glass production had been introduced during the 1st century AD. Glassblowing allowed glass workers to produce vessels with considerably thinner walls, decreasing the amount of glass needed for each vessel. Glass blowing was also considerably quicker than other techniques, and vessels required considerably less finishing, representing a further saving in time, raw material and equipment. Although earlier techniques dominated during the early Augustan and Julio-Claudian periods, by the middle to late 1st century AD earlier techniques had been largely abandoned in favour of blowing.

As a result of these factors, the cost of production was reduced and glass became available for a wider section of society in a growing variety of forms. By the mid-1st century AD this meant that glass vessels had moved from a valuable, high-status commodity, to a material commonly available: "a [glass] drinking cup could be bought for a copper coin" (Strabo, Geographica XVI.2). This growth also saw the production of the first glass tesserae for mosaics, and the first window glass, as furnace technology improved allowing molten glass to be produced for the first time. At the same time, the expansion of the empire also brought an influx of people and an expansion of cultural influences that resulted in the adoption of eastern decorative styles. The changes that took place in the Roman glass industry during this period can therefore be seen as a result of three primary influences: historical events, technical innovation and contemporary fashions. They are also linked to the fashions and technologies developed in the ceramic trade, from which a number of forms and techniques were drawn.

Glass making reached its peak at the beginning of the 2nd century AD, with glass objects in domestic contexts of every kind. The primary production techniques of blowing, and to a lesser extent casting, remained in use for the rest of the Roman period, with changes in vessel types but little change in technology. From the 2nd century onwards styles became increasingly regionalised, and evidence indicates that bottles and closed vessels such as unguentaria moved as a by-product of the trade in their contents, and many appear to have matched the Roman scale of liquid measurement. The use of coloured glass as a decorative addition to pale and colourless glasses also increased, and metal vessels continued to influence the shape of glass vessels. After the conversion of Constantine, glass works began to move more quickly from depicting Pagan religious imagery towards Christian religious imagery. The movement of the capital to Constantinople rejuvenated the Eastern glass industry, and the presence of the Roman military in the western provinces did much to prevent any downturn there. By the mid-4th century mould-blowing was in use only sporadically.

Production

Composition

Roman glass production relied on the application of heat to fuse two primary ingredients: silica and soda. Technical studies of archaeological glasses divide the ingredients of glass as formers, fluxes, stabilisers, as well as possible opacifiers or colourants.
Former: The major component of the glass is silica, which during the Roman period was sand (quartz), which contains some alumina (typically 2.5%) and up to 8% lime. Alumina contents vary, peaking around 3% in glasses from the western Empire, and remaining notably lower in glasses from the Middle East.
Flux: This ingredient was used to lower the melting point of the silica to form glass. Analysis of Roman glass has shown that soda (sodium carbonate) was used exclusively in glass production. During this period, the primary source of soda was natron, a naturally occurring salt found in dry lake beds. The main source of natron during the Roman period was Wadi El Natrun, Egypt, although there may have been a source in Italy.
Stabiliser: Glasses formed of silica and soda are naturally soluble, and require the addition of a stabiliser such as lime or magnesia. Lime was the primary stabiliser in use during the Roman period, entering the glass through calcareous particles in the beach sand, rather than as a separate component.

Roman glass has also been shown to contain around 1% to 2% chlorine, in contrast to later glasses. This is thought to have originated either in the addition of salt (NaCl) to reduce the melting temperature and viscosity of the glass, or as a contaminant in the natron.

Glass making

Archaeological evidence for glass making during the Roman period is scarce, but by drawing comparisons with the later Islamic and Byzantine periods, it is clear that glass making was a significant industry. By the end of the Roman period glass was being produced in large quantities contained in tanks situated inside highly specialised furnaces, as the 8-tonne glass slab recovered from Bet She'arim illustrates. These workshops could produce many tonnes of raw glass in a single furnace firing, and although this firing might have taken weeks, a single primary workshop could potentially supply multiple secondary glass working sites. It is therefore thought that raw glass production was centred around a relatively small number of workshops, where glass was produced on a large scale and then broken into chunks. There is only limited evidence for local glass making, and only in context of window glass. The development of this large-scale industry is not fully understood, but Pliny's Natural History (36, 194), in addition to evidence for the first use of molten glass in the mid-1st century AD, indicates that furnace technologies experienced marked development during the early-to-mid-1st century AD, in tandem with the expansion of glass production.

The siting of glass-making workshops was governed by three primary factors: the availability of fuel which was needed in large quantities, sources of sand which represented the major constituent of the glass, and natron to act as a flux. Roman glass relied on natron from Wadi El Natrun, and as a result it is thought that glass-making workshops during the Roman period may have been confined to near-coastal regions of the eastern Mediterranean. This facilitated the trade in the raw colourless or naturally coloured glass which they produced, which reached glass-working sites across the Roman empire.

The scarcity of archaeological evidence for Roman glass-making facilities has resulted in the use of chemical compositions as evidence for production models, as the division of production indicates that any variation is related to differences in raw glass making. However, the Roman reliance on natron from Wadi El Natrun as a flux, has resulted in a largely homogenous composition in the majority of Roman glasses. Despite the publication of major analyses, comparisons of chemical analyses produced by different analytical methods have only recently been attempted, and although there is some variation in Roman glass compositions, meaningful compositional groups have been difficult to establish for this period.

Recycling

The Roman writers Statius and Martial both indicate that recycling broken glass was an important part of the glass industry, and this seems to be supported by the fact that only rarely are glass fragments of any size recovered from domestic sites of this period. In the western empire there is evidence that recycling of broken glass was frequent and extensive, and that quantities of broken glassware were concentrated at local sites prior to melting back into raw glass. In the eastern empire, there is evidence of recycled Roman glass being used to glaze Parthian pottery. Compositionally, repeated recycling is visible via elevated levels of those metals used as colourants.

Melting does not appear to have taken place in crucibles; rather, cooking pots appear to have been used for small scale operations. For larger work, large tanks or tank-like ceramic containers were utilised. In the largest cases, large furnaces were built to surround these tanks.

Glass working
In comparison to glass making, there is evidence for glass working in many locations across the empire. Unlike the making process, the working of glass required significantly lower temperatures and substantially less fuel. As a result of this and the expansion of the Empire, glass working sites developed in Rome, Campania and the Po Valley by the end of the 1st century BC, producing the new blown vessels alongside cast vessels. Italy is known to have been a centre for the working and export of brightly coloured vessels at this time, with production peaking during the mid-1st century AD.

By the early-to-mid-1st century AD, the growth of the Empire saw the establishment of glass working sites at locations along trade routes, with Cologne and other Rhineland centres becoming important glass working sites from the Imperial period, and Syrian glass being exported as far as Italy. During this period vessel forms varied between workshops, with areas such as the Rhineland and northern France producing distinctive forms which are not seen further south. Growth in the industry continued into the 3rd century AD, when sites at the Colonia Claudia Agrippinensis appear to have experienced significant expansion, and by the 3rd and early 4th centuries producers north of the Alps were exporting down to the north of Italy and the transalpine regions.

Glass working sites such as those at Aquileia also had an important role in the spread of glassworking traditions and the trade in materials that used hollow glasswares as containers. However, by the 4th and 5th centuries Italian glass workshops predominate.

Styles

The earliest Roman glass follows Hellenistic traditions and uses strongly coloured and 'mosaic' patterned glass. During the late Republican period new highly coloured striped wares with a fusion of dozens of monochrome and lace-work strips were introduced. During this period there is some evidence that styles of glass varied geographically, with the translucent coloured fine wares of the early 1st century notably 'western' in origin, whilst the later colourless fine wares are more 'international'. These objects also represent the first with a distinctly Roman style unrelated to the Hellenistic casting traditions on which they are based, and are characterised by novel rich colours. 'Emerald' green, dark or cobalt blue, a deep blue-green and Persian or 'peacock' blue are most commonly associated with this period, and other colours are very rare. Of these, Emerald green and peacock blue were new colours introduced by the Romano-Italian industry and almost exclusively associated with the production of fine wares.

However, during the last thirty years of the 1st century AD there was a marked change in style, with strong colours disappearing rapidly, replaced by 'aqua' and true colourless glasses. Colourless and 'aqua' glasses had been in use for vessels and some mosaic designs prior to this, but start to dominate the blown glass market at this time. The use of strong colours in cast glass died out during this period, with colourless or 'aqua' glasses dominating the last class of cast vessels to be produced in quantity, as mould and free-blowing took over during the 1st century AD.

From around 70 AD colourless glass becomes the predominant material for fine wares, and the cheaper glasses move towards pale shades of blue, green, and yellow. Debate continues whether this change in fashion indicates a change in attitude that placed glass as individual material of merit no longer required to imitate precious stones, ceramics, or metal, or whether the shift to colourless glass indicated an attempt to mimic highly prized rock crystal. Pliny's Natural History states that "the most highly valued glass is colourless and transparent, as closely as possible resembling rock crystal" (36, 198), which is thought to support this last position, as is evidence for the persistence of casting as a production technique, which produced the thickly walled vessels necessary to take the pressure of extensive cutting and polishing associated with crystal working.

Vessel production techniques

Core and rod formed vessels
Artisans used a mass of mud and straw fixed around a metal rod to form a core, and built up a vessel by either dipping the core in liquified glass, or by trailing liquid glass over the core. The core was removed after the glass had cooled, and handles, rims and bases were then added. These vessels are characterised by relatively thick walls, bright colours and zigzagging patterns of contrasting colours, and were limited in size to small unguent or scent containers. This early technique continued in popularity during the 1st century BC, despite the earlier introduction of slumped and cast vessels.

Cold-cut vessels
This technique is related to the origin of glass as a substitute for gemstones. By borrowing techniques for stone and carved gems, artisans were able to produce a variety of small containers from blocks of raw glass or thick moulded blanks, including cameo glass in two or more colours, and cage cups (still thought by most scholars to have been decorated by cutting, despite some debate).

Glass blowing: free and mould blown vessels
These techniques, which were to dominate the Roman glass working industry after the late 1st century AD, are discussed in detail on the glass blowing page. Mould-blown glass appears in the second quarter of the 1st century AD.

Other production techniques
A number of other techniques were in use during the Roman period:

Cage cup production
Cameo glass production
Slumping
Casting

Decorative techniques

Cast glass patterns

The glass sheets used for slumping could be produced of plain or multicoloured glass, or even formed of 'mosaic' pieces. The production of these objects later developed into the modern caneworking and millefiori techniques, but is noticeably different. Six primary patterns of 'mosaic' glass have been identified:

Floral (millefiori) and spiral patterns: This was produced by binding rods of coloured glass together and heating and fusing them into a single piece. These were then cut in cross-section, and the resulting discs could be fused together to create complex patterns. Alternately, two strips of contrasting-coloured glass could be fused together, and then wound round a glass rod whilst still hot to produce a spiral pattern. Cross-sections of this were also cut, and could be fused together to form a plate or fused to plain glass.
Marbled and dappled patterns: Some of these patterns are clearly formed through the distortion of the original pattern during the slumping of the glass plate during melting. However, by using spiral and circular patterns of alternating colours producers were also able to deliberately imitate the appearance of natural stones such as sardonyx. This occurs most often on pillar-moulded bowls, which are one of the commonest glass finds on 1st century sites.
Lace patterns: Strips of coloured glass were twisted with a contrasting coloured thread of glass before being fused together. This was a popular method in the early period, but appears to have gone out of fashion by the mid-1st century AD.
Striped patterns: Lengths of monochrome and lacework glass were fused together to create vivid striped designs, a technique that developed from the lace pattern technique during the last decades of the 1st century AD.
The production of multicoloured vessels declined after the mid-1st century, but remained in use for some time after.

Gold glass

Gold sandwich glass or gold glass was a technique for fixing a layer of gold leaf with a design between two fused layers of glass, developed in Hellenistic glass and revived in the 3rd century.  There are a very fewer larger designs, but the great majority of the around 500 survivals are roundels that are the cut-off bottoms of wine cups or glasses used to mark and decorate graves in the Catacombs of Rome by pressing them into the mortar. The great majority are 4th century, extending into the 5th century. Most are Christian, but many pagan and a few Jewish; their iconography has been much studied, although artistically they are relatively unsophisticated.  In contrast, a much smaller group of 3rd century portrait levels are superbly executed, with pigment painted on top of the gold.  The same technique began to be used for gold tesserae for mosaics in the mid-1st century in Rome, and by the 5th century these had become the standard background for religious mosaics.

Other decorative techniques

A number of other techniques were in use during the Roman period, including enamelled glass and engraved glass.

Tesserae and window glass

Shards of broken glass or glass rods were being used in mosaics from the Augustan period onwards, but by the beginning of the 1st century small glass tiles, known as tesserae, were being produced specifically for use in mosaics. These were usually in shades of yellow, blue or green, and were predominantly used in mosaics laid under fountains or as highlights.

Around the same time the first window panes are thought to have been produced. The earliest panes were rough cast into a wooden frame on top of a layer of sand or stone, but from the late 3rd century onwards window glass was made by the muff process, where a blown cylinder was cut laterally and flattened out to produce a sheet.

Chemistry and colours

See also modern glass colors.

These colours formed the basis of all Roman glass, and although some of them required high technical ability and knowledge, a degree of uniformity was achieved.

See also

Ancient glass trade
Speyer wine bottle

References

Bibliography

Allen, D., 1998. Roman Glass in Britain. Princes Risborough, Buckinghamshire, Shire Publications.
Amrein, H.,2001, L'atelier de verriers d'Avenches. L'artisanat du verre au milieu du 1er siècle après J.-C., Cahiers d'archéologie romande 87, Lausanne 2001.
Baxter, M. J., H. E. M. Cool, et al., 2006. Comparing glass compositional analyses. Archaeometry 48/3, 399–414.
Biek, L. and J. Bayley, 1979. Glass and other Vitreous Materials. World Archaeology 11, Early Chemical Technology/1, 1–25.
Brill, R. H., 1999. Chemical Analyses of Early Glasses. New York, Corning Museum of Glass.
Caldera de Castro, M. d. P., 1990. Roman glass in southwest Spain. In Annales du 11e Congres. Amsterdam.
Caron, B., 1993. A Roman Figure-Engraved Glass Bowl. Metropolitan Museum Journal 28, 47–55.
Degryse, P., 2014. Glass Making in the Greco-Roman World, Results of the ARCHGLASS Project, Leuven University Press.
Dussart, O., B. Velde, et al., 2004. Glass from Qal'at Sem'an (Northern Syria): The reworking of glass during the transition from Roman to Islamic compositions. Journal of Glass Studies 46, 67–83.
Evison, V. I., 1990. Red marbled glass, Roman to Carolingian. In Annales du 11e Congres. Amsterdam.
Facchini, G. M., 1990. Roman glass in an excavational context: Angere (VA). In Annales du 11e Congres. Amsterdam.
Fleming, S. J., 1999. Roman Glass; reflections on cultural change. Philadelphia, University of Pennsylvania Museum of Archaeology and Anthropology.
Forbes, R. J., 1966. Studies in ancient technology V. Leiden, Brill.
Freestone, I. C., 2005. The provenance of ancient glass through compositional analysis. Materials Issues in Art and Archaeology 7.
Freestone, I. C., 2006. Glass production in Late Antiquity and the Early Islamic period: a geochemical perspective. Geomaterials in Cultural Heritage: Geological Society of London. Special publication 257: 201–216.
Freestone, I. C., M. Ponting, Hughes, M.J., 2002. Origins of Byzantine glass from Maroni Petrera, Cyprus. Archaeometry 44, 257–272.
Grose, D. F., 1991. Early Imperial Roman cast glass: The translucent coloured and colourless fine wares. Roman Glass: two centuries of art and invention. M. Newby and K. Painter. London: Society of Antiquaries of London.
Gudenrath, W., 2006. Enameled Glass Vessels, 1425 BC – 1800: The decorating Process. Journal of Glass Studies 48, 23.
Jackson, C. M., H. E. M. Cool, Wager, E.C.W., 1998. The manufacture of glass in Roman York. Journal of Glass Studies 40, 55–61.
Meredith, H. G., 2015. Word becomes Image: Open-Work Vessels as a Reflection of Late Antique Transformation. Archaeopress Archaeology Series. Oxford: Archaeopres.
Price, J., 1990. A survey of the Hellenistic and early Roman vessel glass found on the Unexplored Mansion Site at Knossos in Crete. Annales du 11e Congres. Amsterdam.
Rutti, B., 1991. Early Enamelled Glass. In M. Newby and K. Painter (eds.) Roman Glass: two centuries of art and invention. London: Society of Antiquaries of London.
Silvestri, A., G. Molin, et al., 2005. Roman and medieval glass from the Italian area: Bulk characterization and relationships with production technologies. Archaeometry 47/4, 797–816.
Stern, E. M., Roman Mould-blown Glass. Rome, Italy: L'Erma di Bretschneider in association with the Toledo Museum of Art.
Stern, E. M., 1991. Early Exports Beyond the Empire. Roman Glass: two centuries of art and invention. M. Newby and K. Painter. London: Society of Antiquaries of London.
Stern, E. M., 1999. Roman Glassblowing in a Cultural Context. American Journal of Archaeology 103/3, 441–484.
Stern, W. B., 1990. The composition of Roman glass. In: Annales du 11e Congres. Amsterdam.
Velde, B., Year. Observations on the chemical compositions of several types of Gallo-Roman and Frankish glass production. In: 9e Congres International d'Etude Historique du Verre, Nancy, France: Editions du Centre de Publications de L'A.I.H.V.
Whitehouse, D., 1990. Late Roman cameo glass. In: Annales du 11e Congres. Amsterdam.
Whitehouse, D., 1991. Cameo Glass. Roman Glass: two centuries of art and invention. M. Newby and K. Painter. London: Society of Antiquaries of London.(UK)
Wood, J.R. and Hsu, Y-T. (2020): Recycling Roman glass to glaze Parthian pottery. Iraq 82, p. 259–270. https://doi.org/10.1017/irq.2020.9
Wood, J.R. (2022): Approaches to interrogate the erased histories of recycled archaeological objects. Archaeometry https://doi.org/10.1111/arcm.12756

Further reading
 

History of glass

Ancient Roman technology